North Terre Haute is a census-designated place (CDP) in Otter Creek Township, Vigo County, in the U.S. state of Indiana. The population was 4,305 at the 2010 census. It is part of the Terre Haute Metropolitan Statistical Area.

History
A post office was established at North Terre Haute in 1912, and remained in operation until it was discontinued in 1957.

Geography
North Terre Haute is located at  (39.531681, -87.361847).

According to the United States Census Bureau, the CDP has a total area of 3.6 square miles (9.3 km), all land.

Demographics

As of the census of 2000, there were 4,606 people, 1,850 households, and 1,235 families residing in the CDP. The racial makeup of the CDP was 96.18% White, 2.56% African American, 0.30% Native American, 0.35% Asian, 0.04% from other races, and 0.56% from two or more races. Hispanic or Latino of any race were 1.00% of the population.

There were 1,850 households, out of which 30.8% had children under the age of 18 living with them, 51.4% were married couples living together, 11.1% had a female householder with no husband present, and 33.2% were non-families. 27.9% of all households were made up of individuals, and 9.5% had someone living alone who was 65 years of age or older. The average household size was 2.42 and the average family size was 2.94.

In the CDP, the population was spread out, with 26.7% under the age of 18, 8.6% from 18 to 24, 29.3% from 25 to 44, 22.6% from 45 to 64, and 12.8% who were 65 years of age or older. The median age was 36 years. For every 100 females, there were 101.4 males. For every 100 females age 18 and over, there were 92.3 males.

The median income for a household in the CDP was $34,617, and the median income for a family was $42,469. Males had a median income of $33,306 versus $22,813 for females. The per capita income for the CDP was $15,729. About 8.7% of families and 9.6% of the population were below the poverty line, including 8.0% of those under age 18 and 8.7% of those age 65 or over.

References

Census-designated places in Vigo County, Indiana
Census-designated places in Indiana
Terre Haute metropolitan area